Locke Field was a baseball field located in Gainesville, TX on Interstate 35; it was home to the Gainesville Owls for a brief period of time. It has also been used for UIL games over the years. In 2015, it was demolished to make way for an apartment complex.

Appearance by Elvis
On April 14, 1955, Elvis Presley, before he became a household name, performed a concert at Locke Field in Gainesville. Only 150 fans showed up, and the concert drew "in the red."

Sources
 "Texas Almanac 2008-2009," The Dallas Morning News, c.2008

References

Baseball venues in Texas